Chad has two official languages, Arabic and French, and over 120 indigenous languages.  A vernacular version of Arabic, Chadian Arabic, is a lingua franca and the language of commerce, spoken by 40–60% of the population. The two official languages have fewer speakers than Chadian Arabic. Standard Arabic is spoken by around 615,000 speakers. French is widely spoken in the main cities such as N'Djamena and by most men in the south of the country. Most schooling is in French. The language with the most first-language speakers is probably Ngambay, with around one million speakers.

Chad submitted an application to join the Arab League as a member state on 25 March 2014, which is still pending.

Chadian Sign Language is actually Nigerian Sign Language, a dialect of American Sign Language; Andrew Foster introduced ASL in the 1960s, and Chadian teachers for the deaf train in Nigeria.

Niger–Congo languages 
Adamawa languages
Goundo
Kim (15,354, RGPH 1993)
Moundang (160,000, RGPH 1993)
Toupouri (90,785, RGPH, 1993)
Bua languages: Bua, Niellim, Gula Iro, etc. (total < 30,000)

Nilo-Saharan languages

Maban languages
Maba (120,000, SIL 1991)
Massalit (50,857, RGPH 1993)
Karanga
Kendeje
Marfa
Massalat
Surbakhal
Kibet
Runga
Fur languages
Mimi
Amdang (5,000, Bender 1983)
Saharan languages
Tedaga
Dazaga
Kanembu
Zaghawa
Bongo–Bagirmi languages (Central Sudanic)
Bernde
Bagirmi
Berakou
Disa
Gula
Jaya
Kenga (30,000, SIL 1993)
Naba
Fongoro
Barma (44,761, RGPH 1993)
Beraku
Ngambay
Sara (183,471, RGPH 1993)
Sinyar
Eastern Sudanic languages
Tama (63,000)
Sungor (38,000)
Mararit (43,000)
Daju

Afro-Asiatic languages

Semitic languages
Chadian Arabic
Chadic languages
Bidiyo
Buduma
Dangaléat
Gabri
Herdé
Kabalai
Kera
Kimré
Kwang
Lele
Marba
Masana
Masmaje
Mesme
Migaama
Mubi
Musey
Musgu
Nancere
Pévé
Sokoro
Tobanga
Tumak
(Ethnologue lists 54 Chadic languages in Chad altogether, many of them small.)

Creole languages
Sango

Unclassified languages
 Laal (749, SIL 2000)

References

External links 
Ethnologue page on "Languages of Chad"
PanAfrican L10n page on Chad